Better is the fourth studio album by American R&B recording artist Chrisette Michele. The album was released on June 11, 2013. The album features guest appearances from  2 Chainz, Wale, Bilal, Dunson and Nello Luchi.

The album debuted at No. 12 on Billboard 200 with around 27,000 copies sold in the first week. It has sold 133,000 copies in the United States as of May 2016.

Track listing

Charts

Weekly charts

Year-end charts

References

2013 albums
Chrisette Michele albums
Def Jam Recordings albums